Henry Dawley (1646–1703) was MP for Lymington from 1680 to 1685.

Dawley was born at Sparsholt, Hampshire, the son of Henry Dawley and Anne née Worsley. He was educated at Wadham College, Oxford.
In 1670 he married Mary Collins of Newport, Isle of Wight: they had one son and three daughters. He was appointed a Freeman of Winchester in 1677, and of Lymington in 1680. He was Commissioner for Assessment for Hampshire from 1679 to 1680 and again from 1689 to 1702. He was a JP from 1679 to 1689; Commissioner of Inquiry for the New Forest from 1691; and Deputy Lieutenant of Hampshire from 1689.

References

Alumni of Wadham College, Oxford
People from the City of Winchester
17th-century English people
18th-century English people
English MPs 1680–1681
English MPs 1681
1646 births
1703 deaths
English justices of the peace
Deputy Lieutenants of Hampshire
New Forest